Wendy MacNaughton is an illustrator and graphic journalist based in San Francisco. MacNaughton has published eleven books, including three New York Times best-sellers. MacNaughton's work combines illustration, journalism, and social work to tell the stories of overlooked people and places. Her art has appeared in The New York Times, NPR, Juxtapoz, GOOD, Time Out NY, 7x7, and Gizmodo. She has created magazine cover images for 7x7 and Edible SF. Her illustrated documentary series, "Meanwhile," was first published in The Rumpus in 2010, then in 2014 as a book, Meanwhile in San Francisco, the City in Its Own Words. In 2016, 'Meanwhile' became the regular back page column in California Sunday magazine.

Biography

Wendy MacNaughton was born in San Francisco, California. After earning a BFA from Art Center College of Design in 1999, MacNaughton worked as a copywriter and designed a campaign for the first democratic local election in Rwanda in 2000. She has worked on other campaigns in Africa and produced a film in The Democratic Republic of Congo. After her return to the United States, MacNaughton left advertising to take a Masters in International Social Welfare from Columbia University in 2005.

Since 2010, MacNaughton has been working as an illustrator full time. In 2016, MacNaughton and illustrator Julia Rothman co-founded Women Who Draw, an international directory and advocacy platform promoting visibility for underrepresented illustrators.

Coverage of the Guantanamo Military Commission

In December 2019 MacNaughton was tapped to supply illustration to supplement The New York Times coverage of the Guantanamo Military Commissions. During its sixteen years of operation the US Department of Defense had only approved four earlier illustrators. MacNaughton had to undergo a security check, and had to agree to a strict set of rules and other restrictions.

MacNaughton wrote that Carol Rosenberg, the reporter she was working with, had warned her she could not really understand how covering Guantanamo would affect her, until she experienced it herself.  She wrote that there was a list of items that she could not include in her drawings, without making it was obvious something had been left out.  When the officer assigned to approve her work went through her drawings he required her to surrender her hand-written copy of the restricted list, even though it was not classified, and had been previously published.

MacNaughton described only understanding the days proceedings later, when reporters explained it to her. She described covering the court as so stressful that she took up smoking again, even though she had quit ten years previously.

Rosenberg wrote that, when he knew MacNaughton was not present, drawing the court, Khalid Sheikh Mohammed went back to adding a combat jacket over his traditional islamic robes.

Published works
"Salt Fat Acid Heat" (illustrator; Samin Nosrat, author), 2017, Simon & Schuster 
"The Gutsy Girl" (illustrator; Caroline Paul, author), 2016, Bloomsbury 
"Pen & Ink, Tattoos and The Stories Behind Them", (illustrator; Isaac Fitzgerald, editor), 2014, Bloomsbury 
"Meanwhile in San Francisco, The City in its Own Words", 2014, Chronicle Books 
"Lost Cat: A True Story of Love, Desperation, and GPS Technology" (illustrator; Caroline Paul, author), 2013, Bloomsbury 
The Essential Scratch & Sniff Guide to Becoming a Wine Expert (illustrator; Richard Betts, author), 2013, Houghton Mifflin Harcourt

Awards
 2011: Awesome Foundation Grant 
 2011: Outstanding Service Alumni Award, ArtCenter College of Design

Personal life 
MacNaughton lives in San Francisco with her wife, writer Caroline Paul. MacNaughton and Paul collaborated on two books: Lost Cat and The Gutsy Girl.

References

External links

Meanwhile  on The Rumpus

Living people
American women illustrators
American illustrators
Art Center College of Design alumni
Artists from the San Francisco Bay Area
People from Marin County, California
Year of birth missing (living people)
LGBT people from California
21st-century American artists
21st-century American women artists
Columbia University School of Social Work alumni
American lesbian artists